Bertil Duroj (1893–1967) was a Swedish art director. Active in the Swedish film industry he designed the sets for more than a hundred productions during his career. These included The Yellow Clinic (1942).

Selected filmography

 The People of Simlang Valley (1924)
Love and the Home Guard (1931)
 The Österman Brothers' Virago (1932)
 The Love Express (1932)
 A Wedding Night at Stjarnehov (1934)
 Shipwrecked Max (1936)
 Mother Gets Married (1937)
 The Pale Count (1937)
 Adolf Saves the Day (1938)
 A Cruise in the Albertina (1938)
 Home from Babylon (1941)
 Fransson the Terrible (1941)
 Only a Woman (1941)
 If I Could Marry the Minister (1941)
 In Paradise (1941)
 The Talk of the Town (1941)
 Doctor Glas (1942)
 Tomorrow's Melody (1942)
 Nothing Is Forgotten (1942)
 The Yellow Clinic (1942)
 Dangerous Ways (1942)
 Take Care of Ulla (1942)
 She Thought It Was Him (1943)
 Captured by a Voice (1943)
 Gentleman with a Briefcase (1943)
 Mister Collins' Adventure (1943)
 The Brothers' Woman (1943)
 Young Blood (1943)
 Eaglets (1944)
 Appassionata (1944)
 The Forest Is Our Heritage (1944)
 Count Only the Happy Moments (1944)
 Guttersnipes (1944)
 Sextetten Karlsson (1945)
 Maria of Kvarngarden (1945)
 The Serious Game (1945)
 Motherhood (1945)
 Harald the Stalwart (1946)
 Peggy on a Spree (1946)
 Between Brothers (1946)
 Incorrigible (1946)
 Two Women (1947)
 The Night Watchman's Wife (1947)
 The Bride Came Through the Ceiling (1947)
 Loffe the Tramp (1948)
 Åsa-Nisse (1949)
Åsa-Nisse Goes Hunting (1950)
 Perhaps a Gentleman (1950)
 Åsa-Nisse på nya äventyr (1952)
 Åsa-Nisse on Holiday (1953)
 Speed Fever (1953)
 Woman in a Fur Coat (1958)
 Miss April (1958)
 Blackjackets (1959)
 Lovely Is the Summer Night (1961)

References

Bibliography
 Laura, Ernesto G. Tutti i film di Venezia, 1932–1984. La Biennale, Settore cinema e spettacolo televisivo, 1985.

External links

1893 births
1967 deaths
Swedish art directors
People from Södertälje